This is a list of openly lesbian, gay, bisexual, or trans (LGBT) people who have been the head of state or government of a country or a subnational division such as a state, a province, or a territory. Openly LGBT people have served as a national heads of state or government in Iceland, Belgium, Luxembourg, Ireland, San Marino, and Serbia.

Heads of state

Heads of government

Sub-national leaders

Others

Politicians who were closeted while in office and never officially came out or were outed only after their deaths or retirement include:
 Frederick the Great, King of Prussia between 1740 and 1786, was officially married to Elisabeth Christine of Brunswick-Wolfenbüttel-Bevern, but he is considered to have been homosexual by most historians. He had many suspected relationships with men and wrote homoerotic poetry. He never came out, although he did not do much to hide it. After his death, many historians tried to pass off his homosexuality as a rumor, but it is now it is widely accepted.
William II, King of the Netherlands between 1840 and 1849 and head of government until the constitutional reform of 1848, was either gay or bisexual; he had been blackmailed because of his sexual orientation.
  Ludwig II, King of Bavaria between 1864 and 1886. Ludwig never married nor had any known mistresses. His diary, private letters, and other documents reveal his strong homosexual desires, which he struggled to suppress to remain true to the teachings of the Catholic Church. Throughout his reign, Ludwig had a succession of close friendships with men, including his aide-de-camp the Bavarian prince Paul von Thurn und Taxis, his chief equerry and master of the horse, Richard Hornig, the Hungarian theater actor Josef Kainz, and courtier Alfons Weber. Letters from Ludwig reveal that the quartermaster of the royal stables, Karl Hesselschwerdt, acted as his male procurer.
 Prince Maximilian of Baden, German chancellor in 1918. The Prince was gay, and was listed as such in a document by the Baden criminal police when he was young, but married Princess Marie Louise of Hanover. He is said to have been in a relationship with geologist Wilhelm Paulcke from at least 1912. 
 Richard Hatfield, Premier of the province of New Brunswick between 1970 and 1987, never officially came out during his lifetime; his sexual orientation only began to be discussed on the record in media and biographical sources after his death.
 Canaan Banana, the first President of Zimbabwe between 1980 and 1987, was found to be either gay or bisexual in 1997, despite his denial. After a highly publicized trial, he was convicted in 1998 of 11 counts of sodomy and "unnatural acts", for which he was imprisoned for six months.

See also

 List of the first openly LGBT holders of political offices
 List of current heads of state and government
 List of current vice presidents and designated acting presidents
 List of current state leaders by date of assumption of office

References

Heads of government